Robert Lindstedt and Horia Tecău successfully defended their title by beating Alexander Peya and Bruno Soares 6–3, 7–6 in the final.

Seeds

Draw

Draw

External links
 Main Draw

Mens Doubles